Orlando Ruben Jordan (born April 21, 1974) is an actor, stuntman, and semi-retired American professional wrestler. He is best known for his tenure in WWE on its SmackDown brand, where he was a one-time United States Champion and for his time with Impact Wrestling.

Professional wrestling career

World Wrestling Entertainment (2003–2006)

Early years (2003–2004) 
Jordan made his WWE television debut on the May 31, 2003 episode of Velocity, where he defeated Jamie Noble. On June 26, 2003, Jordan made his first SmackDown! appearance as a face at Madison Square Garden, where he lost to John Cena. Although he did not win the match, he was impressive enough that when Cena attacked Jordan after the match was over, The Undertaker, with whom Cena was feuding, came to the ring and helped Jordan to his feet. On the October 2 episode of SmackDown!, Jordan defeated Big Show via countout when Big Show had to run to the restroom after eating a burrito laced with laxatives. Jordan answered an open challenge hosted by Brock Lesnar on the January 29, 2004 episode of SmackDown!, where he was quickly defeated.

The Cabinet and United States Champion (2004–2005) 

After an absence of multiple months due to family issues, Jordan returned on the August 5 episode of SmackDown!, defeating René Duprée. Later in the night, Jordan turned heel by saving WWE Champion John "Bradshaw" Layfield (JBL) from an attack by the Undertaker. On the August 12 episode of SmackDown!, Jordan joined JBL's Cabinet, where he was appointed "Chief of Staff". Jordan faced the Undertaker in the main event later that night, losing by disqualification after JBL attacked Undertaker mid-match. On the August 26 episode of SmackDown!, Jordan once again faced Undertaker, this time with JBL's WWE Championship on the line. The match once again ended in a disqualification after JBL again interfered. On the November 25 episode of SmackDown!, Jordan and JBL defeated Eddie Guerrero and Booker T, after interference from The Basham Brothers, who were made the Cabinet's "co-secretaries of defense" on the December 2 episode of SmackDown!. Jordan, JBL and the Bashams were defeated by Booker T, the Undertaker and Eddie Guerrero in a 4-on-3 handicap match on the December 9 episode of SmackDown!. Jordan entered his first Royal Rumble match at the Royal Rumble on January 30, 2005, but was eliminated by Booker T.

After JBL began a feud with John Cena over the WWE Championship leading up to WrestleMania 21, Jordan faced off with Cena on the March 3 edition of SmackDown!. Jordan defeated Cena with the help of JBL to win the United States Championship, his first and only title in WWE. In a dark match before WrestleMania 21, Jordan competed in a 30-man battle royal, won by Booker T. His first major 
successful title defense was against Heidenreich at Judgment Day. At The Great American Bash, Jordan began feuding with the newly drafted Chris Benoit. Jordan defeated Benoit and retained his United States Championship after removing the turnbuckle pad and shoving Benoit head-first into the exposed steel and covered him for the win. Benoit continued to chase Jordan for the title. He finally defeated Jordan (in a record 25.5 seconds) at SummerSlam to win the title. Following this quick match, Jordan attempted to win the United States Championship back on multiple occasions, leading to 3 consecutive losses with all matches lasting less than a minute. The first rematch lasted 23.4 seconds. During the second rematch, Jordan actually almost knocked out Benoit with a punch in the opening moments but still lost at 22.5 seconds, which was even faster than the first match. During the third match, Jordan stalled until the time, which was being displayed on the TitanTron, went over 25 seconds. He got so excited when his time went over 30 seconds that he dropped his guard and Benoit took the opportunity to lock on the Crippler Crossface for a win at the 49.8 second mark. On the October 14 edition of SmackDown!, Jordan stated that he mastered every counter to Benoit's signature Crippler Crossface. Jordan also stated, if he tapped out to the Crippler Crossface, Jordan would quit this business. Jordan lived up to his words by countering every Crippler Crossface attempt by Benoit. The match ultimately ended after Jordan tapped out to Benoit's Sharpshooter. After those unsuccessful rematches, Jordan later broke away from JBL, although both later made a few appearances together later on.

Various feuds and departure (2005–2006) 

When Booker T got injured halfway through his Best of Seven series for the United States Championship, he needed a replacement to face Chris Benoit. As the series was at 3–1 in Booker's favor, Booker T only needed his replacement to win one match in order to become the United States Champion. Jordan approached him about the position, but Booker T and his wife Sharmell belittled him and made jokes about his quick submission losses to Benoit. Booker asked Randy Orton to substitute for him. After Orton failed to win the deciding match, leading Jordan to once again ask for the position the next week, Booker T once again turned Jordan down after belittling him. During the sixth match in the series, Jordan jumped the rail, grabbed Booker T's crutch, and hit Benoit for a disqualification finish and thus giving Benoit the victory and tying the Best of Seven Series at 3–3. The next week, Jordan ran to ringside to attempt to halt Booker T from winning the championship, but was unable to prevent Orton from eventually beating Benoit to win the series for Booker T. On the January 20 episode of SmackDown!, Jordan faced and lost to Randy Orton after Booker's wife Sharmell distracted the SmackDown! senior official referee Nick Patrick, before Booker hit him with a leg crutch. After the match, Chris Benoit saved him from Booker and Orton, turning him face for the first time since 2004.

Jordan was then pushed down to Velocity and won several matches there. Jordan made his final SmackDown! appearance on the May 12 episode of SmackDown! in a backstage segment, telling Nunzio that he had seen someone who looked like his partner Vito dressed in drag at a night club during the recent UK tour. His final WWE appearance was a loss to Gunner Scott on the May 13 episode of Velocity. On May 26, 2006, WWE released Jordan from his WWE contract, reportedly due to bringing unauthorized people backstage with him.

Independent circuit (2006–2010) 

Jordan began competing on the independent circuit soon after his WWE departure along with wrestling overseas, most notably for Nu-Wrestling Evolution, a promotion based in Italy, as well as New Japan Pro-Wrestling. Jordan became NWE Champion in April 2008. Later in that month, he was involved in a confrontation with the Ultimate Warrior, leading to the return of Warrior after a ten-year absence to face Jordan in a match in June 2008. Jordan lost the title to Warrior on June 25, 2008, in Barcelona, while holding the honor of being Warrior's very last opponent.

Total Nonstop Action Wrestling (2010–2011) 

On the January 4, 2010, live, three-hour, Monday night edition of Total Nonstop Action Wrestling's Impact! television show Jordan made his debut for the company in a backstage segment with D'Angelo Dinero. He then as a heel, defeated Dinero in a singles match on the January 21 episode of Impact!. After scoring an upset victory over Samoa Joe on the February 18 edition of Impact!, Jordan disappeared from television, before re-surfacing on the March 29 edition of Impact!, debuting a new look and starting the bisexual angle he had proposed to WWE creative before his release from that company. On April 9 Jordan signed a new multi-year contract with TNA. On the May 3 edition of Impact!, Jordan debuted his new interview segment, O-Zone, during which he attacked and started a feud with the Global Champion Rob Terry. At Sacrifice Jordan challenged Terry for the Global Championship, but was unsuccessful. The following Thursday on Impact!, Jordan scored a non-title victory over Terry, after capitalizing on Terry's injured knee, which he had injured at Sacrifice. Jordan's feud with Terry came to an end on the June 3 edition of Impact!, when the Global Champion pinned him in a tag team match, where he teamed with Desmond Wolfe and Terry with Abyss.

On the July 21 episode of Explosion, Jordan defeated Homicide. On the July 29 edition of Impact! Jordan, himself formed a dysfunctional tag team with face Eric Young, who had been battling (kayfabe) mental problems ever since taking a bump on the head, being completely unaware of Jordan's sexual orientation and interest in him. On the September 29 edition of TNA Xplosion, Jordan defeated Suicide. On the September 24 edition of TNA Xplosion, Jordan and Eric Young faced Ink Inc. in a losing effort. This led to a rematch at Bound for Glory. Young's antics cost him and Jordan their match against Ink Inc. (Jesse Neal and Shannon Moore). On the October 15 edition of TNA Xplosion, Jordan and Eric Young defeated Rob Terry and Suicide. On the November 3 edition of TNA Xplosion, Jordan defeated Magnus. Upon the team's next appearance on Impact! on December 16, Jordan had turned face as he and Young defeated Generation Me (Jeremy and Max Buck) in a tag team match. On April 17, 2011, at Lockdown, Jordan and Young were unsuccessful in becoming the number one contenders to the TNA World Tag Team Championship in a four tag team steel cage match, which was won by Ink Inc. On May 12, 2011 edition of Impact! Jordan competed in a battle royal to become the #1 contender for the world heavyweight championship but failed to win the match. On June 28, 2011, Jordan faced Magnus in the 1st round of the Xplosion Championship Challenge but lost the match. After this point, Eric Young went on a singles run and won the TNA Television Championship, the title formerly known as the TNA Global Championship, while Jordan was taken off television. Jordan's last TNA match took place on July 2, 2011 at a TNA Live Event where Jordan, Eric Young and Amazing Red defeated Robbie E, Brutus Magnus and Doug Williams in a six-man tag team match. On July 11, 2011, it was reported that Jordan had been released from TNA.

Return to the independent circuit (2011–present) 
On November 5, 2011, at an NWA event, Jordan faced Steve Anthony in a lumberjack match but lost the match. At Outback Championship Wrestling's Battle for Ballarat event on May 31, 2013, Jordan defeated Andy Phoenix in what would be his final match before retiring from professional wrestling.

On June 3, 2016, at Menai Mania II, Jordan beat AWE Heavyweight Champion Luke Knight, having qualified for a title opportunity through the Innerwest rumble. He would, however, drop the title to Knight weeks later.

Orlando is now mainly semi-retired but occasionally appears with the All-Star Wrestling Australia promotion based in Sydney, Australia.

Personal life 
Jordan was misdiagnosed with autism as a child. He also had speech difficulties, and attended classes to help him overcome them. He competed in gymnastics as a child, and participated in amateur wrestling. He attended Boise State University after winning the 1993 state championship at 189 pounds for Hermitage High School in Richmond, Virginia. Before becoming a professional wrestler, he was a member of the United States Forest Service. He then relocated to Florida, where he became a reputable amateur boxer.

In June 2011, Jordan is the co-owner (along with independent wrestler Luke Hawx) of WildKat Sports & Entertainment, a professional wrestling training center located outside New Orleans. Their school has since spawned a Louisiana-exclusive wrestling federation, WILDKAT Pro, which was briefly a member territory of the National Wrestling Alliance. On August 20, 2012, Jordan opened another wrestling school in Melbourne, where he currently resides.

Jordan is openly bisexual. On October 10, 2013, he married a woman in Australia. The following year his daughter was born.

Other media 
Jordan appeared as a playable character in the video games WWE SmackDown vs. Raw 2006 and WWE Day of Reckoning 2.

Championships and accomplishments

Amateur wrestling 
 All–American Wrestling Champion (2 times)
 Central Region (Richmond) Wrestling Champion (3 times)
 National Wrestling Champion (2 times)
 Virginia Commonwealth Games Freestyle Wrestling Champion (1 time)
 Virginia State Wrestling Champion (AAA) (1 time)

Professional wrestling 
 Adelaide Championship Wrestling
 ACW Heavyweight Championship (1 time)
 All Action Wrestling
 AAW World Heavyweight Championship (1 time)
 Australian Wrestling Entertainment
 AWE Championship (1 time)
 High Risk Pro Wrestling
 HRPW World Heavyweight Championship (1 time)
 Maryland Championship Wrestling
 MCW Heavyweight Championship (1 time)
 Nu-Wrestling Evolution
 NWE World Heavyweight Championship (1 time)
 Pro Wrestling Illustrated
 PWI ranked him No. 82 of the 500 best singles wrestlers of the PWI 500 in 2011
 World Wrestling Entertainment
 WWE United States Championship (1 time)
 Wrestling Observer Newsletter
 Worst Gimmick (2010)

References

External links 

 
 
 

1974 births
21st-century professional wrestlers
African-American male professional wrestlers
American male professional wrestlers
American emigrants to Australia
Australian people of African-American descent
Bisexual men
Bisexual sportspeople
Expatriate professional wrestlers
LGBT African Americans
LGBT characters in professional wrestling
LGBT people from New Jersey
LGBT professional wrestlers
American LGBT sportspeople
Living people
NWA/WCW/WWE United States Heavyweight Champions
Professional wrestlers from New Jersey